Yr is the second album by Steve Tibbetts, released in 1980. Originally released by Frammis Records, the CD was released by ECM in 1988.

Track listing

"Ur" - 4:43
"Sphexes" - 3:49
"Ten Years" - 7:45
"One Day" - 2:22
"Three Primates" - 5:07
"You And It" - 7:20
"The Alien Lounge" - 3:42
"Ten Yr Dance" - 3:20

Personnel
 Steve Tibbetts – guitars, kalimba, synthesizer
 Marc Anderson – congas, drums, percussion
 Bob Hughes – bass
 Steve Cochrane – tabla
 Marcus Wise – tabla
 Tim Weinhold – bongos, vase, bells

References

External links
ECM
Yr at Discogs.com

1980 albums
Steve Tibbetts albums